On February 11, 2023, a mass shooting occurred inside Camp Evangelista, an installation of the Philippine Army in Cagayan de Oro. Five people died in the incident including the perpetrator.

Incident
The shooting occurred at around 1:10 am (UTC+8) at the barracks of the 4th Infantry Division's (4ID) Service Support Battalion (SSBn) in Camp Edilberto Evangelista. The camp is an installation of the Philippine Army in Cagayan de Oro.

Private Johmar Villabito, using his own government-issued M16 rifle, opened fire on his fellow soldiers. Four personnel were killed and one injured by Villabito. Villabito was engaged with two other personnel in a gunfight. One of the two killed Villabito in an act of self defense. The victims held the rank of sergeant, corporal, private first class, and private.

Philippine Army chief Romeo Brawner Jr. visited the camp earlier in the month expressing concern on the rising incidence of post-traumatic stress disorder among soldiers.

Aftermath
The Philippine Army and the Philippine National Police opened a joint investigation to figure the motive of the shooter. The 4ID also conducted its own internal investigation. The Army also is looking into possible deficiencies in its recruitment and training process to avoid a similar incident in the future.

References

2023 crimes in the Philippines
Philippine Army
Mass shootings in the Philippines
2023 mass shootings in Asia
Cagayan de Oro
Deaths by firearm in the Philippines
Spree shootings in the Philippines
Workplace shootings
2023 in military history
Military history of the Philippines
February 2023 events in the Philippines
February 2023 crimes in Asia
21st-century mass murder in the Philippines